Helietta is a genus of flowering plants in the citrus family, Rutaceae. Members of the genus are commonly known as barettas, barretas, or barrettas. The generic name honors French physician Louis Théodore Hélie (1802–1867).

Selected species
 Helietta glaucescens Urban (Cuba)
 Helietta parvifolia (A.Gray) Benth. (Lower Rio Grande Valley of Texas, Mexico)

References

External links 

 
Zanthoxyloideae genera
Taxonomy articles created by Polbot
Taxa named by Edmond Tulasne